The award system of the Democratic People's Republic of Korea (North Korea) was initially created less than one month after the foundation of the Republic. During the years of Japanese occupation of Korea, many of the future leaders fled to the Soviet Union. During World War II many if not close to all party leaders and Korean People's Army commanders served in the Soviet Army and as such adopted many of the Soviet awards criteria for their own. During the late 1940s and until the Sino-Soviet Split in late 1958, orders and titles were made in the Soviet Money Mints in Moscow or Leningrad. Soviet made awards were modeled after Soviet orders and made of sterling silver. Initially the orders were attached to clothing with a screw-plate, but after Soviet production stopped, production was moved to North Korea. The screwback was replaced with a pin and the silver content was replaced with cheap tin. With the exception of a few examples of modern orders, Soviet and Czech KPA awards are the most sought after in current militaria markets.

Titles

Orders

Commemorative orders

Medals

Commemorative medals

Prizes

Badges

Honorary titles
Honorary titles include:
 Actor Emeritus
 Artist Emeritus
 
 Merited Athlete
 Merited Artist
 Merited Doctor
 Merited Fisherman
 Merited Journalist
 Merited Miner
 Merited Pharmacist
 Merited Railroad Worker
 Merited Scientist
 Merited Technician
 Merited Teacher
 October 8 Exemplary Educationist
 ""
 
 People's Athlete
 
 People's Journalist
 People's Scientist
 People's Techinican
 People's Teacher
 People's Announcer

See also

Awards and decorations received by Kim Il-sung
Awards and decorations received by Kim Jong-il
Korean People's Army
Kim Il-sung and Kim Jong-il badges
Socialist orders of merit

References

Citations

Sources

Further reading

External links

Orders, Decorations and Medals of the Korean Democratic People's Republic at Medals of the World
North Korean Medals at Rusty Knight's Place
Orders and Medals of the Democratic People's Republic of Korea at Ribbons of Orders and Decorations of the World

Orders and Medals of North Korea at World Awards
Décorations de la Corée du Nord at Semon.fr 
North Korea at Militaria
Korea North at World Orders and Medals